The 2011 Chinese Super League was the eighth season since the establishment of the Chinese Super League, the eighteenth season of a professional association football league and the 50th top-tier league season in China. Guangzhou Evergrande F.C. clinched their first ever Chinese Super League title on September 28, 2011.

Promotion and relegation 
Teams promoted from 2010 China League One
 Guangzhou Evergrande
 Chengdu Blades

Teams relegated to 2011 China League One
 Chongqing Lifan
 Changsha Ginde (Change name to Shenzhen Phoenix and Now named Guangzhou R&F)

Clubs

Stadia and Locations

Managerial changes

Foreign players

The number of foreign players is restricted to five per CSL team, including a slot for a player from AFC countries. A team can use four foreign players on the field in each game, including at least one player from the AFC country. Players from Hong Kong, Macau and Chinese Taipei are deemed to be native players in CSL.

 Foreign players who left their clubs after first half of the season.

League table

Positions by round

Results

Goalscorers
Updated to games played on 2 November 2011.

Top scorers

Awards
 Chinese Football Association Footballer of the Year:  Muriqui (Guangzhou Evergrande)
 Chinese Football Association Young Player of the Year:  Song Wenjie (Qingdao Jonoon)
 Chinese Super League Golden Boot Winner:  Muriqui (Guangzhou Evergrande)
 Chinese Football Association Manager of the Year:  Ma Lin (Liaoning Whowin)
 Chinese Football Association Referee of the Year:  Tan Hai (Beijing)
 Chinese Super League Fair Play Award:Henan Construction, Nanchang Hengyuan, Shandong Luneng Taishan, Qingdao Jonoon, Jiangsu Sainty

Attendances

League Attendance

Top 10 Attendances

References

External links
Chinese Super League official site 

Chinese Super League seasons
1
China
China